Chamaegigas is a genus which contains only one species, Chamaegigas intrepidus, an aquatic plant that is native to central-west Namibia, growing in semi-arid and savanna regions. It grows in shallow temporary pools on granite inselbergs, surviving regular environmental extremes that include drastic daily changes in temperature and pH, along with extreme fluctuations in wetting and drying. Chamaegigas intrepidus means "intrepid dwarf giant", referring to the tiny plant's ability to thrive even in the desert.

Description
Chamaegigas intrepidus grows in intertwined mats, with two different leaves. Two pairs of unequal length leaves float on the water,  and oval-shaped. The flowers have two lips, and are white or pale pink with purple speckles.

Chamaegigas intrepidus is one of approximately 330 desiccant-tolerant vascular plants, 90% of which are found growing on inselbergs. It is one of the rare desiccant-tolerant vascular plants that is not a fern or monocotyledon. The basal leaves can survive complete drying for 4.5 months, with more than 50% of them reviving after receiving moisture—so the plants simply resume growing once the pools fill again after a dry spell. New floating leaves, which do not survive drying as well as the basal leaves, can reach the water surface as soon as 2–4 days after the pool refills, with flowers appearing as early as 4 days after breaking dormancy.

Taxonomy
Chamaegigas intrepidus was discovered by German botanist Kurt Dinter in 1909. The full binomial name translates to "intrepid dwarf giant", referring to the small plant's ability to survive the most extreme conditions. It is considered to be a resurrection plant because it quickly revives from complete dormancy.

Habitat and distribution
The plant is native to central-west Namibia, growing in semi-arid conditions in very shallow temporary pools in granitic rock. The pools can dry out and refill 15 to 20 times each year. The pools also go through daily extremes of temperature and pH. The rhizomes can also be exposed to  temperatures during the 11-month dry season.

Notes

External links
IPNI Listing

Flora of Namibia
Aquatic plants
Linderniaceae
Monotypic Lamiales genera